The 1982–1983 season of the Yugoslav First League, the then top football league in Yugoslavia was won by FK Partizan.

Teams

Changes from last season
Teams promoted from 1981–82 Yugoslav Second League
 Dinamo Vinkovci
 Galenika Zemun

Teams relegated to 1982–83 Yugoslav Second League
 17th place: Teteks
 18th place: NK Zagreb

Overview

League table

Results

Winning squad
PARTIZAN (coach Miloš Milutinović)

Top scorers

Attendance

Overall league attendance per match: 8,725 spectators

See also
1982–83 Yugoslav Second League
1982–83 Yugoslav Cup

References

External links
Yugoslavia Domestic Football Full Tables

Yugoslav First League seasons
Yugo
1982–83 in Yugoslav football